Sadashir Datar (born 1885, date of death unknown) was an Indian long-distance runner. He competed in the marathon at the 1920 Summer Olympics.

References

External links
 

1885 births
Year of death missing
Athletes (track and field) at the 1920 Summer Olympics
Indian male long-distance runners
Indian male marathon runners
Olympic athletes of India
Place of birth missing